Falayh is a sub-district located in Suwayr District, 'Amran Governorate, Yemen. Falayh had a population of 8070 according to the 2004 census.

References 

Sub-districts in Suwayr District